Evan Roos (born 21 January 2000) is a South African rugby union player for Western Province in the Currie Cup and the Stormers in the United Rugby Championship. He can play as a flank, eighth man or lock.

Roos was called up to the South Africa Schools squad in 2018, making three appearances in the 2018 Under-19 International Series, and scoring a try in their match against France.

Evan made his Springbok debut on 9 July 2022, against Wales, and started in the number 8 jersey. He is Springbok #924.

References

External links
 

South African rugby union players
Living people
2000 births
Rugby union locks
Rugby union flankers
Rugby union number eights
Sharks (Currie Cup) players
Sharks (rugby union) players
Stormers players
Western Province (rugby union) players
South Africa international rugby union players